Albertet Cailla was an Albigeois jongleur and troubadour. According to his vida he was "of slight worth" but beloved by his neighbours and the local women. His vida says that he composed one good canso and several sirventes, but only one partimen survives. It was said he never left the Albigeois.

There is a tenso on the merits of old and young women which is ascribed to Albertet in at least two chansonniers, manuscripts I and K.

Notes

Sources

The Vidas of the Troubadours. Margarita Egan, trans. New York: Garland, 1984. .
Shepard, William P. "A Provençal "Debat" on Youth and Age in Women." Modern Philology, Vol. 29, No. 2. (Nov., 1931), pp. 149–161.

French troubadours
Year of death unknown
Year of birth unknown
French male poets